Ileksky District is an administrative and municipal district (raion), one of the thirty-five in Orenburg Oblast, Russia. It is located in the southwest of the oblast. Its administrative center is the rural locality (a selo) of Ilek. Population: 25,150 (2010 Census);  The population of Ilek accounts for 38.8% of the district's total population.

Notable people
 Olga I. Larkina - writer

References

Notes

Sources

Districts of Orenburg Oblast